Dual (abbreviated ) is a grammatical number that some languages use in addition to singular and plural. When a noun or pronoun appears in dual form, it is interpreted as referring to precisely two of the entities (objects or persons) identified by the noun or pronoun acting as a single unit or in unison. Verbs can also have dual agreement forms in these languages.

The dual number existed in Proto-Indo-European and persisted in many of its descendants, such as Ancient Greek and Sanskrit, which have dual forms across nouns, verbs, and adjectives, Gothic, which used dual forms in pronouns and verbs, and Old English (Anglo-Saxon), which used dual forms in its pronouns. It can still be found in a few modern Indo-European languages such as Irish, Scottish Gaelic, Lithuanian, Slovene, and Sorbian languages.

The majority of modern Indo-European languages, including modern English, however, have lost dual through their development and only show residual traces of it. In all these languages, its function has mostly been replaced by simple plurals, although the remnants are evident in the English distinctions: both vs. all, either vs. any, neither vs. none, and so on. A commonly used sentence to exemplify dual in English is "Both go to the same school." where both refers to two specific people who had already been determined in the conversation.

Many Semitic languages also have dual numbers. For instance, in Hebrew - or a variation of it is added to the end of some nouns, e.g. some parts of the body (eye, ear, nostril, lip, hand, leg) and some time periods (minute, hour, day, week, month, year) to indicate that it is dual (regardless of how the plural is formed). A similar situation exists in classical Arabic, where   is added to the end of any noun to indicate that it is dual (regardless of how the plural is formed).

It is also present in those Khoisan languages that have a rich inflectional morphology, particularly Khoe languages, as well as Kunama, a  Nilo-Saharan language.

Comparative characteristics 

Many languages make a distinction between singular and plural: English, for example, distinguishes between man and men, or house and houses.  In some languages, in addition to such singular and plural forms, there is also a dual form, which is used when exactly two people or things are meant.  In many languages with dual forms, the use of the dual is mandatory as in some Arabic dialects using dual in nouns as in Hejazi Arabic, and the plural is used only for groups greater than two.  However, the use of the dual is optional in some languages such as other modern Arabic dialects including Egyptian Arabic.

In other languages such as Hebrew, the dual exists only for words naming time spans (day, week, etc.), a few measure words, and for words that naturally come in pairs and are not used in the plural except in rhetoric: eyes, ears, and so forth.

In Slovene, the use of the dual is mandatory except for nouns that are natural pairs, such as trousers, eyes, ears, lips, hands, arms, legs, feet, kidneys, breasts, lungs, etc., for which the plural form has to be used unless one wants to stress that something is true for both one and the other part. For example, one says  ('my eyes hurt'), but if they want to stress that both their eyes hurt, they say . When using the pronoun / ('both'), the dual form that follows is mandatory.

Although relatively few languages have the dual number, using different words for groups of two and groups greater than two is not uncommon. English has words distinguishing dual vs. plural number, including: both/all, either/any, neither/none, between/among, former/first, and latter/last.

Use in modern languages 
Among living languages, Modern Standard Arabic has a mandatory dual number, marked on nouns, verbs, adjectives and pronouns. (First-person dual forms, however, do not exist; compare this to the lack of third-person dual forms in the old Germanic languages.) Many of the spoken Arabic dialects have a dual marking for nouns (only), and its use can be mandatory in some dialects, and not mandatory in others. Likewise, Akkadian had a dual number, though its use was confined to standard phrases like "two hands", "two eyes", and "two arms". The dual in Hebrew has also atrophied, generally being used for only time, number, and natural pairs (like body parts) even in its most ancient form.

Inuktitut and the related Central Alaskan Yup'ik language use dual forms; however, the related Greenlandic language does not (though it used to have them).

Khoekhoegowab and other Khoe languages mark dual number in their person-gender-number enclitics, though the neuter gender does not have a dual form.

Austronesian languages, particularly Polynesian languages such as Hawaiian, Niuean and Tongan, possess a dual number for pronouns but not for nouns, as nouns are generally marked for plural syntactically and not morphologically. Other Austronesian languages, particularly those spoken in the Philippines, have a dual first-person pronoun; these languages include Ilokano, Tausug, and Kapampangan. These forms mean "we", but specifically "you and I". , loosely "I love you").

The dual was a standard feature of the Proto-Uralic language, and lives on in the Samoyedic languages and in most Sami languages, while other languages like Finnish, Estonian and Hungarian have lost it. The language used by the Sami / Lappish peoples also features dual pronouns, expressing the concept of "we two here" as contrasted to "we". Nenets, two closely related Samoyedic languages, features a complete set of dual possessive suffixes for two systems, the number of possessors and the number of possessed objects (for example, "two houses of us two" expressed in one word).

The dual form is also used in several modern Indo-European languages, such as Irish, Scottish Gaelic, Slovene and Sorbian (see below for details).  The dual was a common feature of all early Slavic languages around the year 1000.

Arabic
In Modern Standard Arabic, as well as in Classical Arabic, the use of dual is compulsory when describing two units. For this purpose, is added to the end of any noun or adjective regardless of gender or of how the plural is being formed. When the dual noun or adjective is rendered in the genitive or accusative forms, the   becomes  .

Besides the noun and adjective dual, there are also dual verb forms of compulsory use for second and third person, together with their pronouns, but none for the first person.

The use of dual in spoken Arabic varies widely and is mostly rendered a   even when in nominative context. Whereas its use is quite common in Levantine Arabic, for instance   meaning "two kilograms", dual forms are generally not used in Maghrebi Arabic, where two units are commonly expressed with the word  , 
as in   meaning "a pair of kilograms", with the noun appearing in singular.

Hebrew

Biblical and Mishnaic Hebrew
In Biblical, Mishnaic, and Medieval Hebrew, like Arabic and other Semitic languages, all nouns can have singular, plural or dual forms, and there is still a debate whether there are vestiges of dual verbal forms and pronouns. However, in practice, most nouns use only singular and plural forms. For example,   "cow / cows". The masculine dual form is shown in pointed text with a pathach; in a purely consonantal text, masculine dual is not indicated at all by the consonants. An example of the dual form is   "day / two days / [two or more] days". Some words occur so often in pairs that the form with the dual suffix  is used in practice for the general plural, such as   "eye / eyes", used even in a sentence like "The spider has eight eyes." Thus words like  only appear to be dual, but are in fact what is called "pseudo-dual", which is a way of making a plural. Adjectives, verbs, and pronouns have only singular and plural, with the plural forms of these being used with dual nouns.

Modern Hebrew
In Modern Hebrew as used in Israel, there is also a dual number, but its use is very restricted. The dual form is usually used in expressions of time and number. These nouns have plurals as well, which are used for numbers higher than two, for example:

The pseudo-dual is used to form the plural of some body parts, garments, etc., for instance:

     ("leg") →     ("legs")
     ("ear") →     ("ears")
     ("tooth") →     ("teeth")
     ("intestine") →     ("intestines")
     ("shoe") →     ("shoes")
     ("sock") →     ("socks")

In this case, even if there are more than two, the dual is still used, for instance יש לכלב ארבע רגליים  ("a dog has four legs").

Another case of the pseudo-dual is duale tantum (a kind of plurale tantum) nouns:

     ("colon", lit. "two dots")
     ("bicycle", lit. "two wheels")
     ("eyeglasses", lit. "two lenses")
     ("sky")
     ("scissors")

Khoe languages
In Nama, nouns have three genders and three grammatical numbers.

The non-Khoe Khoesan languages (Tuu and Kx'a), do not have dual number marking of nouns.

In Indo-European languages 
The category of dual can be reconstructed for Proto-Indo-European, the ancestor of all Indo-European languages, and it has been retained as a fully functioning category in the earliest attested daughter languages. The best evidence for the dual among ancient Indo-European languages can be found in Old Indo-Iranian (Vedic Sanskrit and Avestan), Homeric Greek and Old Church Slavonic, where its use was obligatory for all inflected categories including verbs, nouns, adjectives, pronouns and some numerals. Various traces of dual can also be found in Gothic, Old Irish, and Latin (more below).

Due to the scarcity of evidence, the reconstruction of dual endings for Proto-Indo-European is difficult, but at least formally according to the comparative method it can be ascertained that no more than three dual endings are reconstructible for nominal inflection.  reconstruct the dual endings as:
 Nominative/accusative/vocative: *-h₁(e)
 Genitive/ablative: *-h₁(e) / *-oHs
 Dative: *-me / *-OH
 Locative: *-h₁ow
 Instrumental: *-bʰih₁

The Proto-Indo-European category of dual did not only denote two of something: it could also be used as an associative marker, the so-called elliptical dual. For example, the Vedic deity Mitrá, when appearing in dual form Mitrā́, refers to both Mitra and his companion Varuṇa. Homeric dual  refers to Ajax the Greater and his fighting companion Teucer, and Latin plural  is used to denote both the semi-god Castor and his twin brother Pollux.

Beside nominal (nouns, adjectives and pronouns), the dual was also present in verbal inflection where the syncretism was much lower.

Of living Indo-European languages, the dual can be found in dialects of Scottish Gaelic, but fully functioning as a paradigmatic category only in Slovene, Sorbian, and the Kajkavian and Chakavian forms of Croatian. Remnants of the dual can be found in many of the remaining daughter languages, where certain forms of the noun are used with the number two (see below for examples).

Sanskrit

The dual is widely used in Sanskrit, as noted above. Its use is mandatory when the number of objects is two, and the plural is not permitted in this case, with one exception (see below). It is always indicated by the declensional suffix (and some morphophonemic modifications to the root resulting from addition of the suffix).

For nouns, the dual forms are the same in the following sets of cases, with examples for the masculine noun   (boy):
 nominative/accusative: bālau
 instrumental/dative/ablative: bālābhyām
 genitive/locative: bālayoḥ

In Sanskrit adjectives are treated the same as nouns as far as case declensions are concerned. As for pronouns, the same rules apply, except for a few special forms used in some cases.

Verbs have distinct dual forms in the three persons in both the ātmanepada and parasmaipada forms of verbs. For instance, the root pac meaning "to cook", takes the following forms in the dual number of the present tense, called laṭ lakāra:

(Note that in Sanskrit, the order of the persons is reversed.)

The one exception to the rigidness about dual number is in the case of the pronoun asmad (I/we): Sanskrit grammar permits one to use the plural number for asmad even if the actual number of objects denoted is one or two (this is similar to the "royal we"). For example, while ahaṃ bravīmi, āvāṃ brūvaḥ and vayaṃ brūmaḥ are respectively the singular, dual and plural forms of "I say" and "we say", vayaṃ brūmaḥ can be used in the singular and dual sense as well.

Greek
The dual can be found in Ancient Greek Homeric texts such as the Iliad and the Odyssey, although its use is only sporadic, owing as much to artistic prerogatives as dictional and metrical requirements within the hexametric meter. There were only two distinct forms of the dual in Ancient Greek.

In classical Greek, the dual was all but lost, except in the Attic dialect of Athens, where it persisted until the fifth century BC. Even in this case, its use depended on the author and certain stock expressions.

In Koine Greek and Modern Greek, the only remnant of the dual is the numeral for "two", which has lost its genitive and dative cases (both) and retains its nominative/accusative form.  Thus it appears to be undeclined in all cases.  Nevertheless, Aristophanes of Byzantium, the foremost authority of his time (early 2nd century BC) on grammar and style, and a staunch defender of "proper" High Attic tradition, admonishes those who write  (dative, plural number) rather than the "correct"  (dative, dual number).

Latin
The dual was lost in Latin and its sister Italic languages. However, certain fossilized forms remained, for example,  (twenty), but  (thirty), the words  (both, compare Slavic ),  /  with a dual declension.

Celtic languages
Reconstructed Proto-Celtic nominal and adjectival declensions contain distinct dual forms; pronouns and verbs do not. In Old Irish, nouns and the definite article still have dual forms, but only when accompanied by the numeral  "two". Traces of the dual remain in Middle Welsh, in nouns denoting pairs of body parts that incorporate the numeral two: e.g.  (from  "knee"),  (from  "ear").

As the following table shows,  and  combines with a singular noun, which is lenited. Masculine nouns take no special inflection, but feminine nouns have a slenderized dual form, which is in fact identical to the dative singular.

Languages of the Brythonic branch do not have dual number. As mentioned above for Middle Welsh, some nouns can be said to have dual forms, prefixed with a form of the numeral "two" (Breton , Welsh , Cornish ). This process is not fully productive, however, and the prefixed forms are semantically restricted. For example, Breton  (<  "hand") can only refer to one person's pair of hands, not any two hands from two different people. Welsh  must refer to a period of two consecutive months, whereas  can be any two months (compare “fortnight” in English as opposed to “two weeks” or “14 days”; the first must, but the second and third need not, be a single consecutive period).
The modern Welsh term  (= hands) is formed by adding the feminine (and conjoining) form of 'two' with the word for 'hand' —  becoming  as it is no longer in a stressed syllable.

Germanic languages
The dual was present in all the early Germanic languages, as well as in Proto-Germanic. However, the dual had been entirely lost in nouns by that time, and since verbs agreed with nouns in number, so had the third-person dual form of verbs as a result. The dual therefore remained only in the first- and second-person pronouns and their accompanying verb forms.

Gothic retained this situation more or less unchanged. It had markings for the first and second person for both the verbs and pronouns, for example  "we two" as compared to  "we, more than two". Old English, Old Norse and the other old Germanic languages had dual marking only in the personal pronouns, but not in the verbs.

The dual has disappeared as a productive form in all the living languages, with loss of the dual occurring in North Frisian dialects only quite recently. In Austro-Bavarian, the old dual pronouns have replaced the standard plural pronouns: nominative , accusative  (from Proto-Germanic  and). A similar development in the pronoun system can be seen in Icelandic and Faroese. In these languages, in order to state "all + number", the constructions are  /  ("all two") but  /  ("all three"). In German, the expression  ("both") is equivalent to, though more commonly used than,  ("all two").

Norwegian Nynorsk also retains the conjunction  ("one of two") and its inverse  ("neither of two").

Baltic languages
Among the Baltic languages, the dual form existed but is now nearly obsolete in standard Lithuanian. The dual form  was still used on two-litas coins issued in 1925, but the plural form is used on later two-litas coins.

Slavic languages 
Common Slavic had a complete singular-dual-plural number system, although the nominal dual paradigms showed considerable syncretism, just as they did in Proto-Indo-European. Dual was fully operable at the time of Old Church Slavonic manuscript writings, and it has been subsequently lost in most Slavic dialects in the historical period.

Of the living languages, only Slovene, the Chakavian form and certain Kajkavian forms of Croatian, and Sorbian have preserved the dual number as a productive form. In all of the remaining languages, its influence is still found in the declension of nouns of which there are commonly only two: eyes, ears, shoulders, in certain fixed expressions, and the agreement of nouns when used with numbers.

In all the languages, the words "two" and "both" preserve characteristics of the dual declension. The following table shows a selection of forms for the numeral "two":

Notes:
 In some Slavic languages, there is a further distinction between animate and inanimate masculine nouns.
 Variant form for the masculine/neuter locative and instrumental in Serbo-Croatian:  / .

In Common Slavic, the rules were relatively simple for determining the appropriate case and number form of the noun, when it was used with a numeral. The following rules apply:
 With the numeral "one", both the noun, adjective, and numeral were in the same singular case, with the numeral being declined as an pronoun.
 With the numeral "two", both the noun, adjective, and numeral were in the same dual case. There were separate forms for the masculine and neuter-feminine nouns.
 With the numerals "three" and "four", the noun, adjective, and numeral were in the same plural case.
 With any numeral above "four", the numeral was followed by the noun and adjective in the genitive plural case. The numeral itself was actually a numeral noun that was declined according to its syntactic function.

With the loss of the dual in most of the Slavic languages, the above pattern now is only seen in the forms of the numbers for the tens, hundreds, and rarely thousands. This can be seen by examining the following table:

The Common Slavic rules governing the declension of nouns after numerals, which were described above, have been preserved in Slovene. In those Slavic languages that have lost the dual, the system has been simplified and changed in various ways, but many languages have kept traces of the dual in it. In general, Czech, Slovak, Polish and Ukrainian have extended the pattern of "three/four" to "two"; Russian, Belarusian and Serbo-Croatian have, on the contrary, extended the pattern of "two" to "three/four"; and Bulgarian and Macedonian have extended the pattern of "two" to all numerals. The resulting systems are as follows:
 In Czech, Slovak, Polish and Ukrainian, numerals from "two" to "four" are always followed by a noun in the same plural case, but higher numerals (if in the nominative) are followed by a noun in the genitive plural.
 In Belarusian and Serbo-Croatian, numerals from "two" to "four" (if in the nominative) are followed by a noun in a form originating from the Common Slavic nominative dual, which has now completely or almost completely merged with the nominative plural (in the case of Belarusian) or genitive singular (in the case of Serbo-Croatian). Higher numerals are followed by a noun in the genitive plural.
 In Russian, the form of noun following the numeral is nominative singular if the numeral ends in "one", genitive singular if the numeral ends in "two" to "four", and genitive plural otherwise. As an exception, the form of noun is also genitive plural if the numeral ends in 11 to 14. Also, some words (for example, many measure words, such as units) have a special "count form" (счётная форма) for use in numerical phrases instead of genitive (for some words mandatory, for others optional), for example, восемь мегабайт, пять килограмм and пять килограммов, три ряда́ and три ря́да, and полтора часа́.
 In Bulgarian and Macedonian, all numerals are followed by a noun in a form originating from the Common Slavic nominative dual, which has now been re-interpreted as a "count form" or "quantitative plural".

These different systems are exemplified in the table below where the word "wolf" is used to form nominative noun phrases with various numerals. The dual and forms originating from it are underlined.

The dual has also left traces in the declension of nouns describing body parts that humans customarily had two of, for example: eyes, ears, legs, breasts, and hands. Often the plural declension is used to give a figurative meaning. The table below summarizes the key such points.

Slovene 

Along with the Sorbian languages, Chakavian Croatian, and the extinct Old Church Slavonic, Slovene uses the dual. Although popular sources claim that Slovene has "preserved full grammatical use of the dual," Standard Slovene (and, to varying degrees, Slovene dialects) show significant reduction of the dual number system when compared with Common Slavic. In general, dual forms have a tendency to be replaced by plural forms. This tendency is stronger in oblique cases than in the nominative/accusative: in standard Slovene, genitive and locative forms have merged with the plural, and in many dialects, pluralization has extended to dative/instrumental forms. Dual inflection is better preserved in masculine forms than in feminine forms. Natural pairs are usually expressed with the plural in Slovene, not with the dual: e.g.  "hands",  ears. The dual forms of such nouns can be used, in conjunction with the quantifiers  "two" or  "both", to emphasize the number: e.g.  "I only have two hands". The words for "parents" and "twins" show variation in colloquial Slovene between plural and dual. Standard Slovene has replaced the nominative dual pronouns of Common Slavic ( "the two of us",  "the two of you",  "the two of them" [m./f./n.]) with new synthetic dual forms:  (literally, "we-two"), .

Nominative case of noun  "wolf", with and without numerals:

The dual is recognised by many Slovene speakers as one of the most distinctive features of the language and a mark of recognition, and is often mentioned in tourist brochures.

The table below shows a comparison of the conjugation of the verb , which means "to do, to make, to work" and belongs to Class IV in the singular, dual, and plural.

The table below shows the imperative forms for the verb  ("to walk") in the first and second persons of the imperative (the imperative does not exist for first-person singular).

Sorbian language 
As in Slovenian, the Sorbian language (both dialects Upper and Lower Sorbian) has preserved the dual. For nouns, the following endings are used:

 The genitive form is based on the plural form of the noun.
 The -e ending causes various softening changes to occur to the preceding constant, for further information see the article on Sorbian.

For example, the declension of sin (masculine) and crow (feminine) in the dual in Upper Sorbian would be given as

The table below shows a comparison of the conjugation of the verb , which means "to write" and belongs to Class I in the singular, dual, and plural.

Languages with dual number 

Afroasiatic languages
Egyptian (including Coptic)
Semitic languages
Akkadian (Assyrian and Babylonian)
Biblical Hebrew
Classical Arabic
Gulf Arabic (in nouns)
Levantine Arabic
Maltese
Sabaean
Ugaritic
Austronesian languages
Tagalog language
Cebuano language
Ilocano language
Polynesian languages
Māori (only the personal pronouns)
Samoan (only the personal pronouns)
Tongan (only the personal pronouns)
Tahitian (only the personal pronouns)
Hawaiian (only the personal pronouns)
Chamorro (reflected in the verb)
 Indo-European languages
 Avestan
 Ancient Greek
 Germanic languages (only first and second person pronouns and verb forms)
 North Frisian (only pronouns in some dialects)
 Gothic
 Old Frisian (only the personal pronouns)
 Old English (only the personal pronouns)
 Old Norse (only the personal pronouns)
 Icelandic (only the personal pronouns)
 Old Saxon (only the personal pronouns)
 Insular Celtic languages:
 Old Irish
 Irish (only nouns, only following the numeral for two)
 Scottish Gaelic (only nouns, only following the numeral for two)
 Old Church Slavonic
 Old East Slavic
 Sanskrit
 Punjabi (largely, but not limited to, nouns for paired body parts; concurrent with the instrumental case)
 Slovene
 Chakavian
 Sorbian languages:
 Lower Sorbian
 Upper Sorbian
Pama–Nyungan languages
Woiwurrung–Taungurung language
Yidiny
Barngarla
 Uralic languages
 Khanty
 Mansi
 Nenets
 Sami languages
 Other natural languages
Alutor
American Sign Language
Dogrib (only in the first person)
Hopi (nouns)
Hmong
Inuktitut
Khamti
Khoe languages
Komo language
Koryak
Kunama language
Lakota (only the personal pronouns, always means "you and I")
Mapuzungun
Melanesian Pidgin (several related languages)
Mi'kmaq
Nhanda
Santali (nouns)
Tonkawa
Xavante language
Yaghan
Constructed languages
Quenya (elvish language created by J.R.R Tolkien)
Adûnaic (human language created by J.R.R Tolkien)

See also
Grammatical number

Notes

References

 

 Fritz, Matthias. Der Dual im Indogermanischen. Heidelberg: Universitätsverlag Winter, 2011.

 Fontinoy, Charles. Le duel dans les langues sémitiques. Paris: Les Belles Lettres, 1969.

 Wilhelm von Humboldt (1828). Über den Dualis. Berlin

 

 

Grammatical number
2 (number)